Ohio's 5th congressional district is in northwestern and north central Ohio and borders Indiana. The district is currently represented by Republican Bob Latta.

Counties represented
Crawford
Hancock
Henry
Huron
Lorain
Mercer
Paulding
Putnam
Seneca
Van Wert
Wood (partial)
Wyandot (partial)

List of Largest Municipalities

The largest municipalities represented in this district include:

Lorain, population 65,211
Elyria, population 52,656
Findlay, population 41,202
North Ridgeville, population 35,552
Bowling Green, population 29,636
Avon Lake, population 25,206
Avon, population 24,847
Norwalk, population 16,238
Fostoria(*), population 13,931
Bucyrus, population 13,224
Amherst, population 12,681
Galion(*), population 11,341
Celina, population 10,935
Van Wert, population 10,690

(*) Denotes that areas of the city are located in another Congressional District.

Election results from presidential races

List of members representing the district

Election results
The following chart shows historic election results. Bold type indicates victor. Italic type indicates incumbent.

2010

2012

2014

2016

2018

2020

2022

Historical district boundaries

See also
Ohio's congressional districts
List of United States congressional districts
Ohio's 5th congressional district special election, 2007

References

 Congressional Biographical Directory of the United States 1774–present

05
Constituencies established in 1813
1813 establishments in Ohio